Lingnan Secondary School (嶺南中學) is a secondary school located in Heng Fa Chuen, Hong Kong. It was established on Stubbs Road, and moved to its present campus in 1999. Different from other education institutions in the town, Lingnan Secondary School's students do not necessarily come from this town.

References

External links 

 

Heng Fa Chuen
Secondary schools in Hong Kong